People, places, and things commonly known as Baby V include:
 Vanessa Hudgens — American actress and singer
 Vonzell Solomon — American singer